PaizaCloud Cloud IDE is a Cloud IDE(online integrated development environment). It supports programming languages, including C, C++, PHP, Ruby, Perl, Python, JavaScript with Node.js, and Go. It enables developers to get started with coding immediately with browser-based development environment. 

It is written almost entirely in JavaScript, and uses Node.js on the back-end. The editor component uses Ace. As of Dec 2017, it uses Docker containers for its workspaces.

Gino, Inc. is the company that actively maintains PaizaCloud Cloud IDE. The company has offices in Tokyo.

Features

 Built-in terminal, with npm and basic Unix commands
 Code completion for snippets and identifiers
 Multiple cursors for simultaneous editing
 Parenthesis, bracket, and quote character matching
 File management
 Text Editor
 Browser-in-browser
 Terminal
 Floating window manager mode / Tab window manager mode
 HTTP listening port detection
 Listen on almost all ports
 Ability to drag-and-drop files into your project
 Plug-in support
 Syntax highlighting for the following languages: C#, C/C++, Clojure, CoffeeScript, ColdFusion, CSS, Apache Groovy, Java, JavaScript, LaTeX, Lua, Markdown, OCaml, PHP, Perl, PowerShell, Python, Ruby, Scala, SCSS, SQL, Textile, X(HTML), XML

See also
 SourceLair
 Codeanywhere
 Online JavaScript IDE

References 

Integrated development environments
Cloud applications
Online integrated development environments